Bill Fernandez is a user-interface architect and innovator who was Apple Computer's first full time employee when they incorporated in 1977 and was issued badge number 4. He is the son of  Jeryy  Fernandez and Bambi Fernandez (both Stanford University graduates).  He is credited with introducing fellow Homestead High School student Steve Jobs to his friend (and Homestead alumn) Steve Wozniak and developing schematics for the Apple II so the computer could be mass produced.

Career at Apple 
Fernandez worked on the Cream Soda Computer with Steve Wozniak in 1971, the first computer designed by Wozniak and built using spare parts from Wozniak's job. He would later join Apple and work on both the Apple I and Apple II personal computers, and in the 1980s was a member of the Apple Macintosh development team. He contributed to several user interface aspects of the classic Mac OS, QuickTime and HyperCard and owns a user interface patent granted in 1994. He was laid off from Apple in 1993.

Popular Culture 

 Fernandez appeared in the 2011 documentary about Apple, One Last Thing.
 Fernandez is portrayed by the actor Victor Rasuk in the 2013 film Jobs.

References

External links
Apple's First Employee: The Remarkable Odyssey of Bill Fernandez by Jason Hiner

Fernandez Bill n°4
Living people
American computer businesspeople
21st-century American engineers
Apple II family
Year of birth missing (living people)